The Ascosphaeraceae are a family of fungi in the Ascomycota, class Eurotiomycetes.

References

External links

Onygenales
Ascomycota families
Taxa described in 1955